Michael Bentley may refer to:

 Michael Bentley (cricketer) (born 1934), former English cricketer
 Michael Bentley (historian) (born 1948), English historian of British politics